The 160th Fighter Squadron (160 FS) is an inactive unit of the Alabama Air National Guard.   It was last assigned to the 187th Fighter Wing, stationed at Montgomery Air National Guard Base, Alabama.   It was inactivated on 13 September 2007, with personnel and equipment being transferred to the 100th Fighter Squadron.

History
Authorized by the National Guard Bureau in 1947 as the 160th Fighter Squadron, Alabama Air National Guard. Organized at Birmingham Municipal Airport and extended recognition as a new unit on 1 October 1947 with no previous World War II history or lineage.

The squadron was assigned to the 117th Fighter Group and equipped with F-51D Mustangs.  The unit's initial mission was the air defense of Alabama.  Was re-equipped with RF-51D Mustangs in 1950, being assigned to Tactical Air Command.  Its mission was changed to daylight aerial reconnaissance.  Its aircraft were former World War II F-5 Mustangs which had been used in the United States in a training role.

Korean War activation

The squadron and its parent 117th Fighter Group were federalized due to the Korean War on 10 October 1950.  On 1 November the Mustangs were transferred to other units and the 160th was re-equipped with RF-80A Shooting Star photo-reconnaissance jets and transferred to Lawson AFB, Georgia.   At Lawson, the wartime group was formed as the 160th Tactical Reconnaissance Squadron, the 157th TRS (South Carolina ANG) (RF-80) and 112th TRS (Ohio ANG) (RB-26).  The 117th Tactical Reconnaissance Group was assigned to Ninth Air Force, Tactical Air Command.

After over a year at Lawson AFB for transition training, and also because the Groups planned base, Toul-Rosières Air Base, France was under construction, finally in January 1952 the group deployed to the United States Air Forces in Europe (USAFE).   However at the time of the 117th's arrival, Toul AB consisted of a sea of mud, and the new jet runway was breaking up and could not support safe flying. The commander of the 117th deemed it uninhabitable and its flying squadrons of the wing were dispersed to West Germany. The 112th TRS was transferred to Wiesbaden AB, the 157th TRS deployed to Fürstenfeldbruck AB, and the 160th deployed to Neubiberg AB. The non-flying Headquarters and Support organizations were assigned to Toul.

The mission of the 117 TRG was to provide tactical, visual, photographic and electronic reconnaissance by both day and night, as was required by the military forces within the European command. The RF-80's were responsible for the daylight operations; the RB-26s for night photography.  In June 1952, the 117th was involved in Exercise 'June Primer'. This exercise took place in an area bordered by a line drawn from Cherbourg to Geneva in the east and in the west by the Swiss, Austrian and Russian occupation zone borders.

The two RF-80 squadrons of the 117th had to complete a number of varying missions, including vertical photography of prospective paratroop air drop zones, oblique photos of the Rhine and Danube river bridges, vertical photography of the airfields of Jever, Fassburg, Celle, Sundorf and Gütersloh and various visual missions on behalf of the seventh army, including artillery adjustment for the 816th field artillery. The 157 TRS had had wire recorders fitted to five of its RF-80's prior to June Primer and these greatly facilitated the latter missions.

By July 1952 the facilities at Wiesbaden AB were becoming very crowded, and it was felt that the B-26's could fly from the primitive conditions at Toul. The 112 TRS returned to Toul, however the jet-engined RF-80's remained in West Germany until a new runway was constructed.

On 9 July 1952 the activated Air National Guard 117 TRG was released from active duty. All of the aircraft and support equipment remained at Toul. The 117 TRG was inactivated and its mission was taken over by the newly activated 10th Tactical Reconnaissance Wing.

Cold War

The squadron was returned to Alabama State Control and was re-formed in Birmingham in the fall of 1952, being re-equipped with the RF-51D Mustang.  Sharing the facility with the 106th Tactical Reconnaissance Squadron as well as the expanding civil airport led to congestion and in 1953, the 160th TRS was moved to the Montgomery Regional Airport.   The Mustangs were at the end of their USAF service in 1955 and the squadron received RF-80s which were also at the end of the line for their USAF service.

On 28 September 1956 its parent 117th Tactical Reconnaissance Group was inactivated and discontinued.  The reason was that the Groups World War II predecessor unit, the 354th Fighter Group, was re-activated at the new Myrtle Beach AFB, South Carolina.   The 117th designation was re-allotted to the Alabama ANG as a new organization, with no World War II lineage or history, and federal recognition was extended the same day.   Also in 1956, the 160th began to receive new RF-84F Thunderstreak jet photo-reconnaissance aircraft directly from Republic, replacing the obsolete RF-80s.    The squadron continued to operate the RF-84s for the next fifteen years.

During the 1961 Berlin Crisis, the 117th TRG was again federalized, along with the 160th TRS on 1 October 1961.  The federalized 117th TRG consisted of the 106th TRS at Birmingham; the 153d TRS (Mississippi ANG); the 184th TRS (Arizona ANG), and the 117th.  Due to federal budget restrictions, only the 106th Tactical Reconnaissance Squadron was deployed to Dreux-Louvilliers AB, France.  However elements of all three other squadrons rotated to France as part of the USAFE 7117th Tactical Wing until the crisis was defused and the 117th TRG and subordinate squadrons were returned to their various state control on 31 August 1962.

On 15 October 1962, the 160th was authorized to expand to a group level, and the 187th Tactical Reconnaissance Group was established by the National Guard Bureau. The 160th TRS becoming the group's flying squadron. Other squadrons assigned into the group were the 187th Headquarters, 1187th Material Squadron (Maintenance), 187th Combat Support Squadron, and the 187th USAF Dispensary.

In 1971 the RF-4C Phantom II photo-reconnaissance aircraft was being withdrawn from Southeast Asia, and the 160th began to receive these Vietnam War veteran aircraft. The RF-84Fs were retired and during the 1970s the squadron flew the Phantoms in its aerial reconnaissance mission.

Tactical Fighter

In 1983 the 117th was re-aligned from its photo-reconnaissance mission and converted to a tactical fighter mission, transferring its RF-4Cs and receiving Vietnam Veteran F-4D Phantom IIs.  The Phantoms were primarily used for Air Defense as part of the Air Defense, Tactical Air Command (ADTAC) division of TAC.   By 1988 the Phantoms were being withdrawn from the Air Force inventory, and the 160th began to receive Block 30 F-16C/D Fighting Falcons to use in the air defense mission.

During the 1990s, the 187th has undertaken an ambitious and successful regimen of participation in many Total Force deployments. These deployments have taken the men and women of the 187th to exercises in South Korea, Norway, Guam, Hawaii, Alaska, and many other stateside locations. By far the most significant deployments have been for contingency operations enforcing United Nations sanctions against Iraq. In 1995, the unit deployed for a 30-day rotation to Incirlik AB, Turkey for Operation Provide Comfort II. The following year, the Wing deployed to Al Jaber AB, Kuwait for Operation Southern Watch. Then in 1997, the Wing returned to Incirlik for Operation Northern Watch. These operations were to enforce the respective northern and southern no-fly zones over Iraq.

Global War on Terrorism

After the 9/11 attacks, the 187th performed Combat Air Patrol flights as part of Operation Noble Eagle in the United States. The unit sustained this effort for Operation Noble Eagle for one year following the events of 11 September.

The 187th was again called to active duty in January until April 2003 as part of the largest military mobilization since the 1991 Gulf War. This marked the largest unit activation in the units 50-year history with over 500 personnel being deployed along with aircraft and equipment for Operation Iraqi Freedom (OIF). The 187th, as an integral part of the Total Force, deployed to Prince Hassan Air Base (H-5) and Shahid Muafaq Al-Salti Air Base, Jordan, as the lead unit, commanding a mixture of Air National Guard, Air Force Reserve, Active Air Force and British Royal Air Force units comprising the 410th Air Expeditionary Wing. This marked the largest integration of coalition Air and Special Forces Operations in history with over 3,500 personnel operating out of this location. The 410th's mission was to prevent Iraqi missile launches against coalition forces and neighboring countries.

In September 2004 the unit again deployed over 300 personnel with aircraft and equipment to Al Udeid AB, Qatar for Operation Iraqi Freedom. This deployment also marked a significant first for the unit and the U.S. Military. The 187th was the first unit to ever use the GBU-38 Joint Direct Attack Munition in combat. The GBU-38 is a 500 lb global positioning system (GPS) guided bomb which, while being very effective, minimizes collateral damage. The GBU-38 is a precision guided munition commonly referred to as a "Smart Bomb". This weapon was effectively employed by the 187th in the Battle of Fallujah.

In 2006, the 160th Expeditionary Fighter Squadron deployed to Balad AB, Iraq for 90 days and became part of the 322d Expeditionary Fighter Squadron in support of Operation Iraqi Freedom (OIF).

Inactivation
In 2007, it was announced that the Alabama Air National Guard would activate the 100th Fighter Squadron so the state could honor the legacy of the World War II Tuskegee Airmen.  As a result, the 160th Fighter Squadron would be inactivated, and the new 100th FS would assume its personnel, equipment and aircraft.    The 160th Fighter Squadron stood down in a ceremony at Montgomery Air National Guard Base, on 13 September 2007, with the 100th Fighter Squadron standing up and being bequeathed the history, lineage, and honors of the World War II 100th Fighter Squadron and its successor units.

Lineage

 Designated 160th Fighter Squadron and allotted to Alabama ANG in 1947
 Extended federal recognition on 1 Oct 1947
 Ordered to active service on 10 October 1950
 Re-designated: 160th Tactical Reconnaissance Squadron, 1 November 1950
 Re-designated: 160th Tactical Reconnaissance Squadron (Photo Jet), 1 July 1951
 Relieved from active duty and returned to Alabama ANG, on 10 July 1952
 Ordered to active service on 1 October 1961
 Relieved from active duty and returned to Alabama ANG, on 31 August 1962
 Re-designated: 160th Tactical Fighter Squadron, 1 Jul 1983
 Re-designated: 160th Fighter Squadron, 15 Mar 1992
 Designated: 160th Expeditionary Fighter Squadron when deployed and attached to United States Air Forces Central
 Inactivated on 13 September 2007; personnel and equipment transferred to 100th Fighter Squadron

Assignments
 117th Fighter Group, 1 October 1947
 117th Tactical Reconnaissance Group, 1 September 1950 – 28 September 1956
 117th Tactical Reconnaissance Group, 28 September 1956
 187th Tactical Reconnaissance Group, 15 Oct 1962
 187th Tactical Fighter Group, 1 Jul 1983
 187th Fighter Group, 15 Mar 1992
 187th Operations Group, 1 October 1995 – 13 September 2007

Stations
 Birmingham Municipal Airport (later Sumpter Smith Field), Alabama, 1 Oct 1947
 Operated from: Lawson AFB, Georgia, 1 Nov 1950
 Operated from: Neubiberg Air Base, West Germany, 27 January 1952 – 10 July 1952
 Montgomery Regional Airport, Alabama, 1953
 Elements operated from: Dreux-Louvilliers Air Base, France, 1 October 1961 – 31 August 1962
 Designated: Montgomery Air National Guard Base, Alabama, 1991-13 September 2007

Aircraft

 F-51D Mustang, 1947–1950
 RF-51D Mustang, 1950–1951, 1953–1955
 RF-80A Shooting Star, 1951–1953, 1955–1956
 RF-84F Thunderstreak, 1956–1971

 RF-4C Phantom II, 1971–1983
 F-4D Phantom II, 1983–1988
 Block 30 F-16C/D Fighting Falcon, 1988–2007

 MQ-9 Reaper, 2015-Present

References

 187th Fighter Wing history page
 187th Fighter Wing@globalsecurity.org
 Rogers, B. (2006). United States Air Force Unit Designations Since 1978. 

Squadrons of the United States Air National Guard
Fighter squadrons of the United States Air Force
Military units and formations in Alabama
Military units and formations disestablished in 2007